Church arson is the burning of, or attempting to burn, religious property. Around the world, arson is committed because empty churches are a soft target, or due to excommunication, racial hatred, pyromania, prejudice against certain religions or religious beliefs greed, as part of a sectarian campaign of communal violence, or as a means of anonymously registering dissent or anti-religious sentiment.

In the United States, arson of black churches was common in the south around the 1960s during the civil rights struggles. Arson continued to proliferate, especially in the 1990s, damaging many black churches. As a result, Congress passed the Church Arson Prevention Act in 1996. In addition, President Bill Clinton formed the National Church Arson Task Force due to the sharp increase in church arson. The Bureau of Alcohol, Tobacco, and Firearms (ATF) was created as a division of the Treasury Department in 1972 to investigate arson (it is now a part of the Department of Justice).

By country

Australia
In 2015, St. James church in Brighton, Melbourne was burnt to the ground after allegations of sexual abuse came out regarding former priest Ronald Pickering. Australian actress Rachel Griffiths, formerly a member of the church, said she was 'quite elated'.

St. Mary's Catholic Church in Dandenong, also connected to Pickering, was burnt as well. St. Mary's Church in St Kilda East was damaged by suspicious fire after being connected to former priest and convicted child sex offender Kevin O'Donnell.

Canada

The historic St. John's Anglican Church of Lunenburg, Nova Scotia caught fire in a suspected arson on Halloween night, 2001. It was later reconstructed, reopening on June 12, 2005.

A serial church arsonist in Merritt, British Columbia was arrested following the burning of the 143-year-old Murray United Church.

St. Andrew’s Anglican Church and South Caradoc United Church, both in Muncey, Ontario, were destroyed by fire on the same day after former Anglican priest David Norton was convicted of sex crimes against children in his parish.

After the 2021 Canadian Indian residential schools gravesite discoveries, at least seven B.C. Catholic churches on Indigenous land were burned to the ground. An Anglican church in B.C. was found on fire but the fire was isolated and put out. Prime Minister Justin Trudeau, the band governments and chiefs have condemned the arsons. Other groups voiced support for the arsons. Harsha Walia, the executive director of the British Columbia Civil Liberties Association, tweeted "burn it all down," and the Union of British Columbia Indian Chiefs expressed "strong solidarity with (Harsha Walia) in condemning the brutally gruesome genocide of residential ‘school’ system by Canada and Church while crown stole FN land".

Chile
In the lead-up to Pope Francis's visit to Chile in January 2018, there were a number of arson attacks on churches in the capital, Santiago. Typically, the attacks involved firebombing accompanied by spraying of accelerants. A barrel believed to contain flammable liquid was discovered in one evangelical church. However the damage was insignificant and was quick and easy to repair. Pamphlets addressing the pontiff left at the scene of one of the conflagrations read: "The next bombs will be in your cassock." The papal visit was dominated by issues surrounding the sex-crimes of Reverend Fernando Karadima, whose protégé Bishop Juan Barros was protected by the Pope, despite accusations of complicity. Chilean President Michelle Bachelet addressed the "strange" firebombing of the churches on radio: "In a democracy, people can express themselves as long as they do it in a peaceful way."

India

During the 1998 attacks on Christians in southeastern Gujarat, the Human Rights watch reported dozens of churches and prayer halls burned down by Sangh Parivar organizations.

Hundreds of churches were set on fire and burnt down during the 2008 Kandhamal violence in the Kandhamal district of Orissa.

In St. Sebastian's Church in Delhi severely burned in December 2014. Although the authorities initially claimed that the fire was structural, the police later announced that the fire was caused by arson.

Niger
Following the Charlie Hebdo shooting in January 2015, 45 churches were burned down by Islamists in Niger.

Norway

On 6 June 1992, the Fantoft Stave Church, a wooden structure built in 1150 in Fortun, when the Vikings converted to Christianity and moved to Bergen in 1883, was burnt down. At first the fire was attributed to lightning and electrical failure. In January 1993 Varg Vikernes, also known as "Count Grishnackh", was interviewed by a local journalist in his apartment decorated with 'Nazi paraphernalia, weapons, and Satanic symbols'. Vikernes, a proponent of White nationalism, survivalism and his racialist neopagan ideology, has declared that he wants to blow up Blitz House and Nidaros Cathedral. He has publicly supported black metal fans burning down eight churches in Norway. He used a photo of the charred remnants of one church taken soon after the fire on his band Burzum's album entitled Aske (Norwegian for ashes). Following his statement the Norwegian authorities began to clamp down on the black metal scene.

In 1994, Vikernes was found guilty of murder, arson and possession of illegal weapons (including explosives) and given the maximum sentence under Norwegian law of 21 years in prison. He was released in 2009.

United Kingdom
In 1973, St Mary's Church in Putney, London, was badly damaged in an arson attack. On 20 October 1987 the church of St Peter's Church, Eaton Square in central London was set on fire by an anti-Catholic arsonist, who mistook the building for a Roman Catholic church.

In 1998 the church of St Bartholomew Allen's Cross in Northfield, a district of the UK's second city, Birmingham, was attacked by arsonists. The church was deemed beyond repair and demolished in 2008. St Barnabas' Church in Erdington, Birmingham was badly damaged by fire in 2007, arson is suspected.

United States

History
Within the Hate Crime Statistics Act, blacks are one of the groups that are the targets of the most hate crimes of any type, one of which is arson to their places of worship. An African-American scholar and historian, C. Eric Lincoln, wrote in his book, Coming Through the Fire: Surviving Race and Place in America, that the first recorded church arson to a black church happened in 1822 in South Carolina. These kinds of arsons also occurred in Cincinnati in 1829 and through the 1830s in Philadelphia by white mobs. In the 1950s and 1960s, as civil rights activism and the desegregation of public places such as schools and restaurants were starting to increase, so was the burning and bombing of black churches. A more notorious bombing in September, 1963, occurred to the 16th Street Baptist Church in Birmingham, Alabama, where four young girls were killed. Church arson continued to be a problem in the southern United States in the early 1990s for African American churches. The arsonists were generally young, white males with racism as their driving force, and were often under the influence of drugs and alcohol. Although arson began happening at white churches in January 1995, it was still mostly directed towards black churches. The motive for these church burnings began crossing from racial hatred to other motives such as revenge, vandalism, and the influence of media. For example, a gang of Georgia teenagers who were high school dropouts, robbed, vandalized, and burned 90 churches that were both black and white. When interrogated, they told the police that if they couldn’t get money, they vandalized or burned the place as a result of this.

Church Arson Prevention Act
The S. 1980 (104th): Church Arson Prevention Act of 1996 was introduced to Congress on June 19, 1996, but died because the Senate Committee found some places for improvement of the bill. It was sponsored by congressman Duncan Faircloth. On May 23, 1996, the House of Representatives introduced H.R. 3525 (104th): Church Arson Prevention Act. The Act was passed by both houses in Congress and signed by President Bill Clinton on July 3, 1996. This bill became law number Pub.L. 104-155. It was sponsored by Republican Henry Hyde. The bill was summarized by the Congressional Research Service as follows: “[the Church Arson Prevention Act of 1996] makes Federal criminal code prohibitions against, and penalties for, damaging religious property or obstructing any person’s free exercise of religious beliefs applicable where the offense is in or affects, interstate commerce.” One of the changes in the bill was the sentence increase for “defacing or destroying any religious real property because of race, color, or ethnic characteristics…” from 10 to 20 years. It also changed the statute of limitations from five years to seven years after the date the crime was committed. It reauthorizes the Hate Crimes Statistics Act.

National Church Arson Task Force 
President Clinton created the National Church Arson Task Force (NCATF) to look for any connections among the church arsons and help take off some loads of overburdened state and local police forces. According to a first-year report to the president in June 1997, they opened investigation to 429 cases of arson, bombings, or attempted bombings of churches since January 1, 1995. In a second-year report in October 1998 to the president, they opened 241 more cases that happened between January 1, 1995, and September 8, 1998, making a total of 670 opened investigations. In a third-year report in January 2000 to the president, NCATF opened an investigation to another 157 cases making it a total of 827. They helped to solve many of these arson and bombing cases. The Task Force is now disbanded, but the Bureau of Alcohol, Tobacco, Firearms, and Explosives (ATF) continues to investigate church burnings that occur. The number of church arsons decreased drastically (82 percent) from 1,320 in 1980 to 240 in 2002 according to the National Fire Protection Association.

A 2013 National Fire Protection Association report found that 16% of fires at religious buildings were intentionally lit.

2015
After the Charleston church shooting in June 2015, a number of suspected church arson attacks were documented.

See also
 Desecration
 Iconoclasm
 16th Street Baptist Church bombing
 1999 Lake Worth, Texas church fire
 2010 East Texas church burnings
 Cross burning
 R.A.V. v. City of St. Paul
 Carpenters for Christmas
 Donald Trump photo op at St. John's Church

References

Anti-Christian sentiment
Attacks on churches
Hate crimes
Arson